Summersby is a surname. Notable people with the surname include: 

Charles Summersby (1882–1961), British draper and Liberal National politician
Kay Summersby (1908–1975), personal secretary to Dwight D. Eisenhower
Roy Summersby (1935–2016), English footballer

See also
Sommersby